"Swimming in Your Ocean" is a song by Canadian folk-rock group Crash Test Dummies and was the second single from their 1993 album God Shuffled His Feet. The song reached number six in Canada and topped the Canadian Adult Contemporary chart for three weeks. It was also popular in Iceland, reaching number 10 on the Icelandic Singles Chart.

Music video
االغعل
The music video features Crash Test Dummies as a lounge band performing to a group of old women.

Charts

Weekly charts

Year-end charts

References

1993 songs
1994 singles
Crash Test Dummies songs
Song recordings produced by Jerry Harrison
Songs critical of religion
Songs written by Brad Roberts
Bertelsmann Music Group singles
Arista Records singles